The Oregonator is a theoretical model for a type of autocatalytic reaction. 
The Oregonator is the simplest realistic model of the chemical dynamics of the oscillatory Belousov–Zhabotinsky reaction.
It was created by Richard Field and Richard M. Noyes at the University of Oregon. It is a portmanteau of Oregon and oscillator.

Earlier, the Brusselator model was proposed by Ilya Prigogine and his collaborators at the Free University of Brussels
as a portmanteau of Brussels and oscillator.

The Oregonator is a reduced model of the FKN mechanism (developed by Richard Field, Endre Kőrös, and Richard M. Noyes) which still involved 11 reactions and 12 species (21 intermediate species and 18 elementary steps). The Oregonator is characterized by the reactions

See also
Lotka–Volterra equations

Notes

References

Non-equilibrium thermodynamics
Oscillators
Ordinary differential equations